The Barkley-Grow T8P-1 was an airliner developed in the United States shortly before the Second World War. Although it saw limited production, the type was well-received as a bush plane in Canada.

Design and development
Typical for the era, the Barkley-Grow T8P-1 was a low-wing monoplane of all-metal construction with a twin tail (an additional third tail was installed, à la Lockheed Constellation, when fitted with floats). The T8P (standing for Transport, 8 Passenger) was designed to be simple and rugged, thus the main units of the tailwheel undercarriage were not retractable, and this may have negatively impacted the type's reception in the marketplace. A novel design feature, however, was the wing structure. Barkley used what might be called a "horizontal cell" technique that has no ribs or spars.  Long tapered strips of aluminium were bent to form V shapes which were then riveted tip to tip to form an "X".  These "X"s are riveted inside the wing side by side to produce the long "cells".  This wing structure was unique to the Barkley-Grow and according to mechanics who worked on the aircraft it was very light, very stiff, very expensive to build, and difficult to repair if damaged, but it gave no problems in service.

Like its two main competitors, the Lockheed Model 12 Electra Junior and the Beech 18, the T8P-1 was originally designed to a 1935 Bureau of Air Commerce specification (eventually won by the Lockheed entry).

Operational history
Sales in the US were disappointing, only 11 being built, and most machines (seven) were sold to Canada, where the fixed undercarriage was no obstacle to the fitting of skis or pontoons.  One was selected for a record flight from Washington D.C. to Peru, and another was used in the Antarctic by the US Navy.

In 1942 A T8P-1 flown by Maritime Central Airways was used in the rescue attempt of survivors of a B-17 on the Greenland ice shelf. The aircraft was fitted with skis but force-landed on the ice on 22 December 1942 after encountering strong headwinds. The T8P-1 broke through the ice and sank leaving the pilots to be rescued by Inuit tribesmen.

Surviving aircraft
 1 – T8P-1 in storage at the Reynolds-Alberta Museum in Wetaskiwin, Alberta.
 3 – T8P-1 on static display at the Alberta Aviation Museum in Edmonton, Alberta. It is on loan from The Hangar Flight Museum.
 8 – T8P-1 (CF-BQM) on static display at The Hangar Flight Museum in Calgary, Alberta.

Specifications

See also
 Lockheed Model 10 Electra

References
Notes

Bibliography

 Gerritmas, Joop and Hazewinkel Harm. "The Barkley-Grow T8P-1." AAHS Journal 50 (4), 2005. 
 Taylor, J.H. Jane's Encyclopedia of Aviation. London: Studio Editions, 1989, p. 121. .
 Wegg, John. General Dynamics Aircraft and their Predecessors. London: Putnam, 1990. .
 World Aircraft Information Files (File 890 Sheet 02). London: Bright Star Publishing.

External links

 Calgary Aero Space Museum 2006

T8P-1
1930s United States airliners
Low-wing aircraft
Aircraft first flown in 1937
Twin piston-engined tractor aircraft